The Cathedral Basilica of St. Joseph is a large Roman Catholic church in Downtown San Jose, which serves as the cathedral for the Roman Catholic Diocese of San Jose in California, with the distinction of minor basilica.

The basilica is named for Saint Joseph, patron saint of the Catholic Church and namesake of San Jose, California.

History

The original St. Joseph's Church was called San Jose de Guadalupe built on the site of the current basilica in 1803, and was the first non-mission parish built in California for the benefit of Spanish settlers instead of the Mission Indians (Ohlone). The Pueblo de San Jose de Guadalupe was connected with Mission Santa Clara by The Alameda which was part of the historic El Camino Real. The original adobe structure was damaged by earthquakes in 1818 and 1822.

In 1835, prominent Californio businessman Antonio Suñol donated the land at the northeast corner of the Plaza del Pueblo (modern Plaza de César Chávez) for the construction of a new, larger adobe church. Suñol, alongside his brother-in-law Antonio María Pico (who served as Alcalde of San José at the time), oversaw the construction of the church for the next eight years until its completion and consecration in 1846. In 1842, Suñol petitioned Francisco García Diego y Moreno, the Bishop of the Californias, for proper religious vestments and relics for the church. The second church was severely damaged by the 1868 Hayward earthquake.

Work on the third church began in 1869. The third church was destroyed by fire in 1875, and a temporary fourth church was built a few blocks away while the fifth and current church was being constructed. The fifth church was dedicated by Joseph Alemany, Archbishop of San Francisco, in 1877 while construction continued. The current portico was completed in 1884, and the large dome was finished in 1885.

In 1981, a major renovation project was begun at the church, which was to become the cathedral for the new Roman Catholic Bishop of San Jose. In 1985, the church was elevated to a cathedral, pending completion of the restoration in 1990. It replaced Saint Patrick Proto-Cathedral Parish, located a few blocks away, as the cathedral of the diocese. The cathedral was made a minor basilica by Pope John Paul II in 1997.

The Cathedral Basilica of St. Joseph is listed as a California Historical Landmark and is listed on the National Register of Historic Places.

Architecture

Plaques at entrance
Just inside the entrance to the cathedral are two plaques that read:

Joseph bible quotes
The top of the walls of the inside of the cathedral include quotes from the Vulgate about Joseph:
 - ANGELVS DOMINI APPARVIT IN SOMNIS JOSEPH NOLI TIMERE ACCIPERE MARIAM CONIVGEM TVAM
 - EXSVRGENS JOSEPH A SOMNO FECIT SICVT PRÆCEPIT ET ANGELVS DOMINI ET ACCEPIT CONIVGEN SVAM
 - FVTVRVM EST VT HERODES QVÆRAT PVERVM AD PEDENDVM ET MATREM EIVS NOCTE ET SECESSIT IN ÆGYPTVM
 - DIXIT MATER EIVS ECCE PATER TVVS ET EGO DOLENTES QVÆREBVS TE
 - DESCENDIT CVM EIS ET VENIT NAZARET ET ERAT SVBDITVS ILLIS
 - ET JESVS PVTABATVR FILIVS JOSEPH

Stained glass windows
The stained glass windows going counter clockwise from the east transept depict:
 Agony in the Garden
 Crucifixion
 Saint Aloysius Gonzaga
 Saint Catherine of Alexandria
 Saint Patrick
 Saint John
 Saint Luke
 The Holy Family
 Saint Casimir
 Saint Edward the Confessor
 Saint John the Baptist
 Saint Mark
 Saint Matthew
 Saint Margaret Mary Alacoque & The Sacred Heart of Jesus
 Saint Francis Xavier
 Saint Claude de la Colombière
 Resurrection
 Ascension

Odell pipe organ
The Odell pipe organ was built in 1886 by the J. H. and C. S. Odell Company in Yonkers, New York. It is the only such Odell instrument surviving in its original condition in the United States. It has 40,000 parts. It has 27 ranks of 60 pipes each. It was restored in 1987–90.

Gallery

See also
List of Catholic cathedrals in the United States
List of cathedrals in the United States

References

External links

 Official Cathedral Site
 Roman Catholic Diocese of San Jose Official Site
Cathedrals of California

Joseph
Joseph
Roman Catholic Diocese of San Jose in California
Roman Catholic churches in San Jose, California
National Register of Historic Places in Santa Clara County, California
Churches on the National Register of Historic Places in California
1803 establishments in New Spain
Roman Catholic churches completed in 1885
19th-century Roman Catholic church buildings in the United States
Tourist attractions in San Jose, California
Churches in Santa Clara County, California
Church buildings with domes
California Historical Landmarks
Cathedrals in San Jose, California